Brien Ibrican Cokayne, 1st Baron Cullen of Ashbourne  (born Brien Ibrican Adams; 12 July 1864 – 3 November 1932) was a British businessman and banker.

Cokayne was the fourth son of George Edward Cokayne ( Adams until 15 August 1873), author of The Complete Peerage, the son of William Adams and his second wife, Mary Anne, granddaughter of Charles Cokayne, 5th Viscount Cullen. His mother was Mary Dorothea, daughter of George Henry Gibbs and sister of Hucks Gibbs, 1st Baron Aldenham. He was educated at Charterhouse School.

Cokayne was a partner in the firm of Anthony Gibbs and Sons, merchants and bankers, and also served as Deputy Governor from 1915 to 1918 and as Governor from 1918 to 1920 of the Bank of England. Appointed a Knight Commander of the Order of the British Empire in 1917, in 1920 he was raised to the peerage as Baron Cullen of Ashbourne, of Roehampton in the County of Surrey, a revival of the Cullen title held by his paternal ancestors. He was also appointed a Grand Cordon of the Order of the Sacred Treasure by Japan.

Lord Cullen of Ashbourne married Grace Margaret, daughter of Reverend the Hon. John Marsham, in 1904. They had three sons and three daughters. He died in November 1932, aged 68, and was succeeded in the barony by his eldest son Charles.

Arms

Footnotes

References
Kidd, Charles, Williamson, David (editors). Debrett's Peerage and Baronetage (1990 edition). New York: St Martin's Press, 1990, 

1864 births
1932 deaths
People educated at Charterhouse School
English bankers
Barons in the Peerage of the United Kingdom
Knights Commander of the Order of the British Empire
Governors of the Bank of England
Deputy Governors of the Bank of England
Barons created by George V